James Phang Wah, born 1961, is a convicted felon currently serving a jail term. Before his arrest and conviction, he was the founder and "international president" of the now-defunct multi-level marketing firm, Sunshine Empire, an unlicensed 'investment' company that was in fact a Ponzi scheme.

Controversial claims
During media interviews, Phang described himself as a legend and 'better than Warren Buffett'. However, his name has never appeared on the List of Singaporeans by net worth, which lists all the billionaires and millionaires in Singapore. It is also not known whether James Phang Wah has met Warren Buffett. In addition, Phang also claimed to have over one million students worldwide and to control more than US$300 million (S$439 million) in assets. Before his arrest and conviction, Phang emphasised that he 'would not harm anyone and my businesses are legal'. He also claimed that in his seminars, his loyal participants would also shout "Father, I love you!".

As Phang's name did not appear on Singapore's 40 Richest list from Forbes in 2007 and 2008, his claims to personal success and wealth is therefore highly improbable.

Commercial Affairs Department investigation 
Phang was investigated by Commercial Affairs Department in November 2007, two months after the Monetary Authority of Singapore placed Sunshine Empire on the investor alert list.

On 2 February 2009, Phang, his wife and Hoo were arrested and were remanded overnight. They were subsequently released on bail of $600,000 each and their passports impounded. They were driven away in a convoy of Mercedes-Benzes and BMWs. He was addressed as 'Lao Da' ('chief' in Mandarin) as he got into his car.

On 3 February 2009, Phang, with three others including Jackie Hoo Choon Cheat, a director of Sunshine Empire were charged with fraudulent trading, failure to maintain proper accounting records of Sunshine Empire and criminal breach of trust as an agent of Sunshine Empire.

Phang faced six charges of falsification of Sunshine Empire’s accounts and one charge of false declaration of the share capital of Empire Communications Technology Pte Ltd. He also faced three charges for possession of uncensored and obscene films at his Westwood Avenue home.

His wife, Neo Kuon Huay, a director of Empire Emall (S) Pte Ltd faced six charges of falsification of Sunshine Empire’s accounts under Section 477A of the Penal Code and one charge of false declaration of the share capital of Empire Emall (S) Pte Ltd.

Phang, with three others, are claimed trial with Subhas Anandan representing all four.

On 16 July 2010, Phang and Hoo were found guilty of perpetuating fraud and criminal breach of trust. Phang and his wife were also found guilty of falsifying accounts. On 30 July 2010, Phang has been sentenced to nine years' jail and fined $60,000 while his wife was also fined $60,000.

Release and criminal charges in Malaysia
Phang was released on 20 December 2017. However, a day after his release, he faced charges of fraud which he committed in Malaysia. He was currently on trial for the crimes he committed in Malaysia.

Personal life
Phang is married to Neo Kuon Huay. He has four children.

References

Living people
Singaporean people of Chinese descent
Singaporean criminals
1961 births